Saraf is a sub-district located in Bani Hushaysh District, Sana'a Governorate, Yemen. Saraf had a population of 3485 according to the 2004 census.

References 

Sub-districts in Bani Hushaysh District